Bang Sai is a district (amphoe) in the southern part of Phra Nakhon Si Ayutthaya province, central Thailand. There is another district of Ayutthaya which shares the same romanization Bang Sai, but has a different spelling in Thai.

History 
The district dates back to khwaeng Sena Noi, which became an amphoe in 1898. It was renamed Ratchakhram in 1923 as the name of central tambon. In 1925 the district office was relocated to tambon Bang Sai, which became the name of the district in 1939.

Geography 
Neighboring districts are (from the north clockwise) Bang Ban, Phra Nakhon Si Ayutthaya, Bang Pa-in of Ayutthaya Province, Sam Khok of Pathum Thani province, and Lat Bua Luang and Sena of Ayutthaya again.

Administration 
The district is divided into 23 sub-districts (tambons).

References 

Bang Sai(1404)